Sasha Sierra Allen (born June 4, 1982) is an American singer and actress. Born and raised in Harlem, New York, she began her career in the music industry as a backing vocalist for the likes of Christina Aguilera, Alicia Keys, John Legend, Leona Lewis, and Usher. In January 2016, she joined the Rolling Stones touring band. In May 2020, she joined The Pussycat Dolls touring band.

Allen portrayed Dionne in the 2009 Broadway revival of Hair at the Al Hirschfeld Theatre and the 2010 West End revival at the Gielgud Theatre. In 2013, she was a semi-finalist on the fourth season of the American version of the singing competition TV series The Voice.

Life and career

Early life
Allen's maternal Bermudian grandmother was one of the first people of African descent to attend Juilliard School of Music. Sasha's maternal grandfather and father were of African American descent. Allen is the elder of two children. She was educated at LaGuardia High School of Performing Arts in New York City.

At the age of 14, she starred in Andrew Lloyd Webber's Whistle Down the Wind. While still in high school, she was featured in commercial and print work, including advertisements in TIME magazine for AT&T.

At 17 she was signed to Elektra Records, working with producers Warryn Campbell (Mary Mary, Kanye West) and J. Moss (Karen Clark Sheard, Kiki Sheard).  Later, she was signed by Arista Records when LA Reid was president. Her album, unfortunately, never came together. Allen says regarding her failed record contracts, “I got caught up in one of those crossroads moments in the record business [...] It was heartbreaking, because singing is what comes most naturally to me.” This caused Sasha to pursue other avenues of performing, such as acting.

2000s 
She was cast in the cult film Camp (2003) starring as "Dee." Allen was spotlighted on VH1's Born to Diva, a pre-American Idol talent reality TV show highlighting her talent.

She has performed on world tours and platinum albums of several performers, including Christina Aguilera's Back to Basics Tour and resulting DVD (Back to Basics: Live and Down Under), John Legend's album Once Again, and Kenny "Babyface" Edmonds' album Playlist. Allen was also the feature vocalist on Babyface's "Playlist" World Tour, singing the classic hits with Babyface that he wrote and produced for Whitney Houston, Toni Braxton, Madonna, and others. Sasha has also toured with Alicia Keys, Leona Lewis, and John Legend, performed with Usher and David Bowie, and recorded with Celine Dion. Allen's television work as a vocalist with musical director Rickey Minor garnered her performances with Jessica Simpson, Patti LaBelle, Yolanda Adams, Fantasia, and Clint Black.

Allen's music showcases her love for rock, soul and R&B. Her first single, "Let's Fly Away", was released on July 4, 2008, and the follow-up, a cover of Joan Osborne's "One Of Us", was released in September 2008. The remix for "Let's Fly Away", produced by Rob Lewis and TrakFire Productions climbed the dance charts.

2012–present, The Voice and afterwards
Returning to reality TV, Allen was selected as a participant for the fourth US season of The Voice. She auditioned with "Not Ready to Make Nice" by the Dixie Chicks, which turned all four coaches' chairs. Sasha decided to join Adam Levine's team. In the battle round she competed against Amber Carrington, who Adam would end up picking, making Sasha available to be stolen. Both Usher and Shakira pressed their button for Sasha, and she opted to join team Shakira. Allen would be the final remaining member of Team Shakira, and the first stolen contestant on The Voice to advance to the semifinals.

Between September 2014 and July 2015, Allen toured the US as "Leading Player" in a revival of the Broadway musical Pippin.

Allen joined The Rolling Stones on their América Latina Olé Tour 2016 as a backing vocalist, filling the role handled by Lisa Fischer since 1989 as Fischer had prior touring commitments. The role included duetting with Mick Jagger on "Gimme Shelter".

Her songs Oh! Darling peaked # 29 on the R&B/Hip-Hop Digital Songs, Ain't No Way # 17, Next To Me # 39, and I Will Always Love You # 39.

The Voice performances and results
 – Studio version of performance reached the top 10 on iTunes

References

External links
 

1982 births
Living people
21st-century American women singers
21st-century American singers
African-American actresses
20th-century African-American women singers
African-American women singer-songwriters
African-American rock singers
American contemporary R&B singers
American women rock singers
American women singer-songwriters
American film actresses
American musical theatre actresses
American people of Bermudian descent
Fiorello H. LaGuardia High School alumni
Participants in American reality television series
The Voice (franchise) contestants
21st-century African-American women singers
Singer-songwriters from New York (state)